Stonewall, also known as Lewis House and Little Falls Plantation, is a historic plantation house located near Rocky Mount, Nash County, North Carolina.  It was built about 1830, and is a two-story, five bay, Federal style brick dwelling.  It sits on a raised basement and has a high hipped roof. The front facade features a pedimented Ionic order portico added in 1915.

It was listed on the National Register of Historic Places in 1970.

References

Plantation houses in North Carolina
Houses on the National Register of Historic Places in North Carolina
Federal architecture in North Carolina
Houses completed in 1830
Houses in Nash County, North Carolina
National Register of Historic Places in Nash County, North Carolina
1830 establishments in North Carolina